Adulfus is a given name. Notable people with the name include:

 Adulfus (bishop of Lugo), Galician clergyman
 Adulfus (bishop of Mondoñedo), Galician bishop

Masculine given names